Juan Carlos García Rulfo Solana (born July 17, 1981, in Guadalajara, Jalisco) is a Mexican retired footballer who last played for Correcaminos UAT in the Ascenso MX.

Club career
In 2009, he began his career with Puebla FC. He debuted against C.F. Pachuca with a 1–2 victory. He only appeared in two official matches for Puebla in the first division, after spending most of his career in the lower divisions.

Garcia joined Primera División side Estudiantes in January 2011. He made his Primera División debut for Estudiantes, entering as a substitute against Atlante, in February 2011.

References

External links
JUAN CARLOS GARCÍA profile

1981 births
Living people
Footballers from Guadalajara, Jalisco
Association football goalkeepers
Mexican footballers
Club Puebla players
Tecos F.C. footballers
Liga MX players